Desaguadero District is one of seven districts of the province Chucuito in Puno Region, Peru.

Authorities

Mayors 
 2011–2014: Juan Carlos Aquino Condori. 
 2007–2010: Wilson Néstor Quispe Mendoza.

See also 
 Administrative divisions of Peru

References

External links 
 INEI Peru